Fort Wood may refer to:

Fort Wood, former fort now serving as the base of the Statue of Liberty
Fort Wood, 1863 Union fortification in Chattanooga, Tennessee, namesake of Fort Wood Historic District
Fort Wood, New Orleans, later renamed Fort Macomb

See also
Fort Leonard Wood, military base in Missouri